Huang Jen-cheng (born 1960 in Taiwan) is a Taiwanese retired football manager.

Career

Huang is the most successful coach in Taiwan, having led Taiwan Power Company to eleven league titles, including nine consecutive ones.

References

Taiwanese football managers
Taiwanese footballers
Living people
1960 births
Chinese Taipei national football team managers
Association footballers not categorized by position